Sorø Klosterkirke (i.e. Sorø Abbey Church) is a church located in the Danish town of Sorø. It was founded by Danish archbishop Absalon and built by Cistercians in the period from 1161 to 1201. It is made of red brick, which was a new material for the time. It is built similar style to the Abbey of Fontenay.

Sorø Academy Foundation (Stiftelsen Sorø Akademi) is responsible for Sorø Abbey.  The foundation also operates Sorø Academy (Sorø Akademi)).

The abbey contains a number of royal graves including that of Archbishop Absalon,  King Christopher II, Queen Euphemia, King Valdemar Atterdag, and King Olaf (II) Haraldsen.

References

External links
Sorø Klosterkirke website
Stiftelsen Sorø Akademi website
Sorø Akademi website

Churches in the Diocese of Roskilde
Churches in Sorø Municipality
Lutheran churches converted from Roman Catholicism